Frederic John Sidney Parry (28 October 1810 – 1 February 1885, Bushey Heath) was an English entomologist who specialised in Coleoptera, principally Lucanidae.

Frederic Parry was educated at Harrow School. He was an army major (17th Lancers 1831 retired  1835). He wrote "Description of a new genus of Lucanidae from New Zealand" (1843), "A decade or description of ten new species from the Kasya Hills near the boundary of the Assam district" (1845) and 17 further papers. The last was "Description of a new species of Chiasognathus" (1876). "Catalogue of Lucanoid Coleoptera with illustrations and descriptions of various new and interesting species" (1864–66, revised 1870) listed 357 species.

Parry was a friend of John Obadiah Westwood and lived at Onslow Square, London, close to the Natural History Museum, then the British Museum (Natural History). 
 
He was a Fellow of both the Entomological Society of London and the Linnean Society.

Many of Parry's specimens ('at one time he had a general collection of Coleoptera, but latterly it was limited to Lucanidae and Cetoniidae, the former being very valuable, and probably the most complete in existence') were purchased by René Oberthür and other dealers and collectors. They are now conserved in the Natural History Museum (Cerambycidae,  Elateridae, Heteromera, Anthribidae, Lucanidae, Cetoniinae and Cleridae). Duplicate specimens from these families and all the Paussidae are in Muséum national d'histoire naturelle in Paris.

Two well-known stag beetles described by Parry are Lucanus swinhoei and Odontolabis castelnaudi.

Notes

References
 Anonym 1885: [Parry, F. J. S.] Entomologist's Monthly Magazine (3) 21 240.

External links
BHL A catalogue of Lucanoid Coleoptera : with illustrations and descriptions of various new and interesting species by Major F.J. Sidney Parry Transactions of the Entomological Society of London Vol 2, pt. 1. Digitised text and plates

1810 births
1885 deaths
People educated at Harrow School
English entomologists
17th Lancers officers
Fellows of the Royal Entomological Society